Ali Çelikiz (born 31 August 1963) is a Turkish boxer. He competed in the men's featherweight event at the 1988 Summer Olympics. At the 1988 Summer Olympics, he lost to Darrell Hiles of Australia.

References

External links
 

1963 births
Living people
Turkish male boxers
Olympic boxers of Turkey
Boxers at the 1988 Summer Olympics
Place of birth missing (living people)
Featherweight boxers
20th-century Turkish people